Marouane Fellaini-Bakkioui (born 22 November 1987) is a Belgian professional footballer who plays as a midfielder for Chinese club Shandong Taishan.

Born in Etterbeek to Moroccan parents, Fellaini played youth football for Anderlecht, R.A.E.C. Mons, Royal Francs Borains and Charleroi S.C. before joining Standard Liège. After winning the Belgian First Division and the Ebony Shoe as a Liège player, he moved to England to join Everton. 

At Everton, he was the club's Young Player of the Season for 2008–09, when the club were losing finalists in the FA Cup. After five years at Everton, he transferred to Manchester United in a deal worth £27.5 million in September 2013. After five years with Manchester United that included four trophies and more than a decade in England in total, Fellaini joined Shandong Taishan in February 2019.

A full international for the Belgium national team from 2007 until his retirement in March 2019, Fellaini amassed 87 caps and 18 goals for The Red Devils. He represented the team at the 2008 Olympics, the 2014 World Cup, Euro 2016, and the 2018 World Cup, helping Belgium to third place in the latter tournament.

Early life
Fellaini was born to Moroccan parents from Tangier and brought up in Brussels. His father, Abdellatif, was a former goalkeeper for Raja Casablanca and Hassania Agadir who signed for Racing Mechelen but was unable to play as his former Moroccan club refused to release his paperwork. Instead of returning home, he opted to become a bus driver for STIB. Fellaini is Muslim.

Club career

Early career
Born in Etterbeek, Brussels Capital-Region, Fellaini began playing football at the age of 8 for Anderlecht. He also competed in athletics, with the 10,000 metres being his preferred event. However, Fellaini's father Abdellatif, who was a professional footballer himself, guided his son towards football.
In his first season at Anderlecht's Academy, he scored 26 goals and in his second he scored 37. He was at Anderlecht's academy until the age of 10 when he joined Mons, due to his father getting a new job in the city. Three years later, he joined R. Francs Borains before leaving the club when he signed for Sporting Charleroi. At the age of 17, he signed his first permanent contract with Standard Liège. Between 2006 and 2008, he made 84 appearances for the club, scoring 11 times. He is known for his heading ability and stamina, which made him one of the best box-to-box midfielders in the Belgian First Division and resulted in him winning the Ebony Shoe in 2008, an award given to the best player of the season of African descent.

Everton
After rejecting the advances of Manchester United and following reported interest from Aston Villa, Real Madrid, Tottenham Hotspur and Bayern Munich, Fellaini signed for Everton in September 2008 on a five-year deal from Standard Liège for an initial transfer fee of £15 million (at the time a record for a Belgian player and club record for Everton). He made his Everton debut in a 3–2 away victory at Stoke City on 14 September 2008, and scored his first goal for the team against Newcastle United in a 2–2 home draw on 5 October 2008. Fellaini went on to score 9 goals in his first season.
During his debut season he was booked 10 times in his first 17 games and avoided a lengthy suspension by attending a personal hearing with England's chief referee, Keith Hackett, where he vowed to improve his behaviour. He picked up three further bookings in 16 games following the meeting, his total the highest of all Premier League players that season.
At the end of the 2008–09 season Fellaini was named Everton's Young Player of the Season.

In England he has become well known for his large afro hairstyle, becoming a fan favourite with Everton fans regularly sporting Afro wigs as a homage to Fellaini. Fellaini was deployed as a second striker during the 2008–09 season, when Everton had all of their forwards out injured, usually playing behind another midfielder being used as an attacker, Tim Cahill. Later Fellaini reverted to play in his least favourite defensive midfield area. His performances in late 2009 and early 2010 became so impressive that David Moyes labelled him "as good as anyone in the league", and he re-iterated this after Fellaini won Man of the Match against Manchester City on 16 January. Fellaini was stretchered off in the 34th minute of the Merseyside derby on 6 February after a two-footed tackle by Sotirios Kyrgiakos, ruling him out for the rest of the 2009–10 season. Kyrgiakos was sent off as a result of Fellaini's injury.

Fellaini suffered an ankle injury in an FA Cup replay victory against Chelsea in February 2011 and although he was able to play in a 2–0 win against Sunderland a week later, the injury caused him to miss the remainder of the 2010–11 season. He did not play a competitive match until August 2011, when he appeared as a substitute in a 1–0 loss to Queens Park Rangers at Goodison Park and played the full match in the very next fixture, as Everton beat Sheffield United 3–1 in the League Cup. In November 2011, he signed a new five-year contract with the club. He finished the season having won the most tackles, aerial duels and made more passes than anyone else at the club. He won the second highest number of tackles in the league and won possession of the ball 190 times, the most out of any player.

In the opening game of the 2012–13 Premier League season against Manchester United, Fellaini received plaudits for his outstanding performance, as he scored the only goal in a 1–0 victory. He continued the season in great form with goals against Arsenal, Manchester City, Sunderland and Fulham amongst others. Fellaini was subsequently awarded Premier League Player of the Month for November 2012.

Fellaini was banned for three matches by the Football Association on 17 December 2012 after headbutting Ryan Shawcross during a game against Stoke City, an incident missed by the match officials at the time. The same month he was ranked as number 60 in "The 100 Best Footballers in the World" by The Guardian.

Manchester United

2013–14 season
On 2 September 2013, Fellaini signed a four-year contract, with the option of extension of another season, reuniting with former manager David Moyes at Manchester United in a £27.5 million, deadline day deal, despite the fact that he had a lower buyout clause earlier in the transfer window. He made his debut for the club on 14 September, in a 2–0 home win against Crystal Palace, coming on as a 62nd-minute substitute for Anderson. He made his full debut on 17 September, starting in a 4–2 win against Bayer Leverkusen in the UEFA Champions League. On 5 November, Fellaini received his first red card for Manchester United in a match against Real Sociedad in the group stage of the Champions League.

In April 2014, Fellaini was named as one of the "10 Worst Buys of the Premier League season" by The Daily Telegraph. He made only fifteen league starts throughout the season, in contrast to thirty one starts he made in the previous season while at Everton.

2014–15 season
In his first pre-season game of 2014–15, Fellaini came off the substitutes bench to score his first Manchester United goal in injury time, giving the club a 2–1 win over Valencia in Louis van Gaal's first game at Old Trafford as manager.

On 20 October 2014, he scored his first competitive goal for Manchester United in a 2–2 draw in the Premier League against West Bromwich Albion two minutes after coming on as a half time substitute. He was given his first start of the season by Van Gaal in the following match against Chelsea, and helped United earn a point against the league leaders. Fellaini covered 12.17 kilometres in the match, the most by any United player, and made 70 high-intensity runs, more than anyone else on the pitch. During second half stoppage time, he contributed to United's goal when his header was saved by Thibaut Courtois and ultimately rebounded in by Robin van Persie. On 2 December, Fellaini scored his first competitive home goal for Manchester United in a 2–1 defeat of Stoke City.

Fellaini's third goal of the season came in a 2–0 away win at Queens Park Rangers on 17 January 2015. On 15 March 2015, he scored his fourth goal of the season and assisted the second goal for Michael Carrick in a home game against Tottenham in which United won 3–0 and he was voted Man of the Match. On 12 April, he scored the second goal for Manchester United in a 4–2 win in the Manchester derby. On 9 May, he scored the winner, his seventh of the season, for Manchester United in a 2–1 win over Crystal Palace. On 24 May, Fellaini was sent off in Manchester United's final Premier League fixture of the season, a 0–0 draw with Hull City at the KC Stadium, 18 minutes after appearing as a substitute.

2015–16 season

On 18 August, his first match for the club in the 2015–16 season, Fellaini scored the third goal in a 3–1 home victory over Club Brugge in the first leg of the Champions League play-offs. On 25 August 2015, Louis van Gaal stated that Fellaini would feature more as a striker. 

Fellaini scored the first goal in a 2–1 win against Everton in the FA Cup semi-final at Wembley Stadium on 23 April 2016. On 5 May, Fellaini was handed a 3-match suspension by the FA for throwing an elbow at Leicester's Robert Huth. Huth was handed the same punishment for tugging at Fellaini's hair during the altercation. He played the full 120 minutes as Manchester United beat Crystal Palace 2–1 in extra time in the 2016 FA Cup Final. He also assisted Juan Mata's equaliser in the final.

2016–17 season

On 7 August 2016, Fellaini played the full 90 minutes in United's 2–1 Community Shield victory over Leicester City. On 4 December, he made his 100th appearance for United against his former club Everton and conceded a penalty just a few minutes after coming on as an 85th-minute substitute. Leighton Baines successfully converted the spot kick in the 89th minute to secure a late equaliser for the Toffees in a match that finished 1–1. Due to José Mourinho's preference for Ander Herrera alongside Paul Pogba in central midfield, Fellaini's appearances for Manchester United had become limited to coming off the bench; however, on 11 January – the day after he scored the second goal in Manchester United's 2–0 win over Hull City in the first leg of their 2016–17 EFL Cup semi-final – Manchester United activated a one-year extension clause in Fellaini's contract, keeping him at the club until the end of the 2017–18 season. The Belgian featured for the entirety of United's 2017 UEFA Europa League Final victory against Dutch club Ajax.

2017–18 season
Fellaini's first goal of the 2017–18 season came against Leicester City, in a 2–0 win on 26 August 2017. He then scored a header against Basel, helping United win the Champions League group stage game 3–0 on 12 September. On 30 September, Fellaini scored a brace in a 4–0 win against Crystal Palace, upping his goal tally to four goals in eight games. After the win, José Mourinho praised his performances, saying “He had to be a strong character. He is a fighter, a guy with lots of pride and I am really pleased I helped him reach this level and change the perception the fans have now. I’m really happy for him”. He signed a new two-year contract at the end of the campaign.

2018–19 season
Fellaini made 19 appearances for Manchester United in the first half of the 2018–19 season, scoring 90th-minute goals against both Derby County in the EFL Cup and Young Boys in the UEFA Champions League. However, after the dismissal of head coach José Mourinho, Fellaini found opportunities limited and he played in just two of nine possible matches under caretaker manager Ole Gunnar Solskjær, both as a substitute.

Shandong Luneng Taishan
At the end of January 2019, Fellaini agreed a contract with Chinese club Shandong Luneng and was officially transferred on 1 February 2019, concluding his five-and-a-half year spell with Manchester United.

International career

Fellaini was eligible to play for either Belgium or Morocco. He chose to represent Belgium, from youth level upwards. He represented the under-23 team at the 2008 Olympics, when they finished in fourth place, losing to Brazil in the bronze medal match. His senior team debut was made in February 2007, and his first goal for the senior team came in a 2–1 defeat against Portugal a UEFA Euro 2008 qualification match.

Fellaini made seven appearances in Belgium's 2014 FIFA World Cup qualification campaign, scoring once, as Belgium reached the finals for the first time since 2002. On 4 June 2014, Fellaini was selected as part of Belgium's 23-man squad for the 2014 World Cup. On 17 June, in Belgium's opening match against Algeria, Fellaini came on as a second-half substitute and scored the Red Devils' equalising goal in a 2–1 win. He was then named in the starting line-up for the second match against Russia on 22 June and went on to play every minute of les Diables Rouges run to the quarter-finals, where they were defeated 1–0 by Argentina in Brasília.

During qualification for UEFA Euro 2016, Fellaini scored two goals in Belgium's 5–0 defeat of Cyprus and the winner in a 1–0 away victory in Israel. Following these goals, on 7 June 2015, he reached five in his last three internationals by scoring the opening two goals in a 4–3 friendly win over France at the Stade de France. On 3 September 2015, he scored his sixth goal in four international appearances against Bosnia and Herzegovina.

At the 2018 FIFA World Cup in Russia, Fellaini scored the equalising goal after Japan had gone 2–0 up in a round of 16 match that saw Belgium win 3–2. On 7 March 2019, Fellaini announced his retirement from international football. He earned a total of 87 caps and scored 18 goals for Belgium between 2007 and 2018.

Career statistics
Club

International

Scores and results list Belgium's goal tally first.NotesHonoursStandard LiègeBelgian First Division: 2007–08Manchester UnitedFA Cup: 2015–16
EFL Cup: 2016–17
FA Community Shield: 2016
UEFA Europa League: 2016–17Shandong TaishanChinese Super League: 2021
Chinese FA Cup: 2020, 2021BelgiumFIFA World Cup third place: 2018Individual'
Best Belgian Player Abroad: 2008
Belgian Bronze Shoe: 2008
Ebony Shoe: 2008
Everton Young Player of the Season: 2008–09
Premier League Player of the Month: November 2012
Belgian Lion Award Best Player Abroad: 2016, 2017, 2018, 2019, 2020

References

External links

Marouane Fellaini profile at the official Manchester United F.C. website

Elitefootball Profile

1987 births
Living people
Belgian sportspeople of Moroccan descent
People from Etterbeek
Belgian Muslims
Belgian footballers
Association football midfielders
R.A.E.C. Mons players
Standard Liège players
Everton F.C. players
Manchester United F.C. players
Shandong Taishan F.C. players
Belgian Pro League players
Premier League players
Chinese Super League players
UEFA Europa League winning players
Belgium youth international footballers
Belgium under-21 international footballers
Olympic footballers of Belgium
Belgium international footballers
Footballers at the 2008 Summer Olympics
2014 FIFA World Cup players
UEFA Euro 2016 players
2018 FIFA World Cup players
Belgian expatriate footballers
Belgian expatriate sportspeople in England
Belgian expatriate sportspeople in China
Expatriate footballers in England
Expatriate footballers in China
FA Cup Final players
Francs Borains players
Footballers from Brussels